The Yorkshire Ramblers' Club (YRC) is the second-oldest mountaineering club in England, the oldest being the Alpine Club.

Founded in 1892, the YRC is still a highly active club mountaineering and caving in the UK and all over the world.

History 
On 13 July 1892 four Yorkshire gentlemen met at the home of a Mr. Herbert Slater in Leeds to discuss the idea of forming a club for individuals interested in promoting the idea of walking and the study of the countryside.  At an open meeting held at the Skyrack Inn, Headingley on 6 October 1892 it was unanimously decided to form a club to organise walking and mountaineering expeditions and encourage the study of nature. The name of the club was picked from others including The Three Peaks Club, but Yorkshire understatement prevailed and the name Yorkshire Ramblers' Club was chosen. Consequently, "greater attention was paid to climbing the Lake District", in both  the club's earliest days and today with the adjoining Scottish Borders also continuing to be of  particular interest to the club.

Cave exploration 
The Yorkshire Ramblers were major exponents in early cave exploration both in Great Britain and in Ireland. Beginning in 1907, members of the Yorkshire Ramblers' Club took a close interest in County Fermanagh, Ireland (later Northern Ireland) with occasional forays into Counties Leitrim and Cavan. Their work included surveys of Marble Arch Cave and its feeders, the first complete descent of Noon's Hole and many other pots. From 1950, in association with the Craven Pothole Club, they considerably extended the Marble Arch system and opened up new ground in Counties Sligo and Cavan.

From 1935 to 1937 the club was active in the Burren, County Clare and recorded the first descent of Pollelva (1935) and discovery of part of Upper Pollnagollum (both later linked to become the longest cave in Ireland), as well as exploring some of the pots on the west side of Slieve Elva (Faunarooska, etc.), Coolagh River Cave and Ballycasheen, near Corofin.

Mountaineering 

Besides caving the club has a long history of mountaineering in the Alps and the greater ranges. Recent trips include...

Himalayas: Kanchenjunga base camps, Nepal2015; Mera Peak, Nepal 2012; Dorje Lapka, Nepal 1995; Nubra, India; Sikkim, India

Andes: Bolivian Apolobamba 1988 (AJ 1989 247-249); Bolivian Cocapata, Real and Occidental; Bolivian Quimsa Cruz 2010; Peruvian Cordillera Blanca 1964 (YRC article)

Arctic: Svalbard 2006, 2008, 2010; Greenland's Liverpool Land 2014

US south west: several visits between 1996 and 2010, ridge climbing and trails; 2015 rock climbing and backpacking in the Wind River range

Africa: Morocco; Malawi 2013

Europe: Bulgaria, Romania, France, Italy, Switzerland, Norway, Spain, Austria, Ireland, Iceland

See also 

 Caving in the United Kingdom

Notes

References

External links 
 Yorkshire Ramblers' Club official site
 The Alpine Club official site

Climbing organizations
Sports clubs in Yorkshire
Caving organisations in the United Kingdom